Herbert Linimair (born 23 November 1973) is an Austrian footballer who plays as a midfielder for Union Regau.

External links
 

1973 births
Living people
Austrian footballers
SK Vorwärts Steyr players
FC Linz players
FC Admira Wacker Mödling players
Association football midfielders
People from Wels
Footballers from Upper Austria